Antisemitism (also spelled anti-Semitism)—prejudice, hatred of, or discrimination against Jews— has experienced a long history of expression since the days of ancient civilizations, with most of it having originated in the Christian and pre-Christian civilizations of Europe.

While it has been cited as having been expressed in the intellectual and political centers of ancient Greece and the Roman Empire, the phenomenon received greater institutionalization within European Christianity following the dissolution of the ancient center of Jewish culture, Jerusalem, resulting in the forced segregation of Jewish populations and restrictions on their participation in the public life of European society at times.

In the 20th century, antisemitism , particularly during the reign of Nazi Germany, resulted in the Holocaust, a program of systematic murder and dislocation of the majority of Europe's Jewish population.

Roman Empire

Middle Ages

 
Antisemitism in Europe in the Middle Ages was largely influenced by the Christian belief that the Jewish people were collectively responsible for the death of Jesus, through the so-called blood curse of Pontius Pilate in the Gospels.

Persecutions against Jews were widespread during the Crusades, beginning in 1095, when a number of communities, especially in France and the Rhineland, were massacred.

On many occasions, Jews were accused of the ritual murder of Christian children in what were called blood libels. The first known blood libel was the story of William of Norwich (d. 1144), whose murder sparked accusations of ritual murder and torture by the local Jews.

The Black Death which devastated Europe in the 14th century also gave rise to widespread persecution. In the face of the terrifying spread of the plague, the Jews served as scapegoats and were accused of poisoning the wells. As a result, many Jewish communities in western and central Europe were destroyed in a wave of violence between 1348 and 1350. For example, some two thousand Jews were massacred by burning in Strasbourg, in February 1349, upon a decision by the city council, before the plague had reached the city. In the German states a total of approximately 300 Jewish communities were destroyed during this period, because of Jews being killed or driven out.

Another aspect of medieval antisemitism was the many restrictions imposed on the Jews. They were excluded from many occupations because of the fear of competition with the local population. For the most part, they could not own land, since, under the feudal system, the pledge of loyalty required from a vassal upon the enfeoffment of land had the form of a Christian oath; however, there were exceptions. Their residence in cities was often limited to specific areas known as ghettos.  Following the Fourth Lateran Council, in 1215, Jews were also ordered to wear distinctive clothing, in some instances a circular badge. Some Jews managed to evade the humiliating requirement of wearing a badge by bribing the local authorities.

In the later Middle Ages, Jews were expelled from smaller and larger regions across western Europe as well as the German lands, including monarchy-wide expulsions from England, in 1290, and France, in 1306 and 1394. The greatest expulsions of Jews were in Spain (1492) and Portugal (1496), where Jews were ordered to convert to Christianity, or to leave the country within six or eleven months, respectively.

The Protestant Reformation saw a rise of antisemitism with Martin Luther's On the Jews and Their Lies. Martin Luther and antisemitism proved that the Protestant church would be virulent to the Jews.

16th to 18th centuries
The Renaissance, Enlightenment and imperialist eras led to a series of increasingly xenophobic and non-religious expressions of antisemitic phobias and outrages, even as much of the continent had experienced significant political reformation.

In western Europe, Jews were largely limited by local monarchs, especially as a consequence of the growing fear of competition with the local merchants due to the fact that the main occupation of Jews was commerce and banking. Notable examples are the limitation of the number of Jews allowed to settle in Breslau issued by Frederick II of Prussia in 1744 and the banishment of Jews from Bohemia by the archduchess of Austria Maria Theresa, who later also stated that Jews had to pay for remaining in the country.

With the development of the banking system and the need of rulers for financing their growing state apparatus, the term "Court Jew" was used in some western European states. The court Jews were businessmen and bankers who received privileges from the sovereign and acted as their treasurers and tax collectors.

In many cases, the court Jews obtained significant power as the "right hand" of the sovereign; in other cases, the court Jews were blamed for the financial problems of the states or when the sovereign lost his power. One notable court Jew was Joseph Süß Oppenheimer (1698–1738) the financial planner for Duke Karl Alexander of Württemberg in Stuttgart. Oppenheimer was executed after the death of the Duke and his story was used by Nazi propaganda.

Most of Europe's Jewish population was concentrated in central and eastern Europe within the borders of the Polish–Lithuanian Commonwealth. The Jews of Poland had been granted an unprecedented degree of religious and cultural autonomy since the Statute of Kalisz in 1264, which was ratified by subsequent Kings of Poland and the Commonwealth. Nevertheless, the Cossack uprising of Bohdan Khmelnytsky in Polish-controlled Ukraine (1648) devastated many Jewish communities and tens of thousands of Jews were massacred, expelled, or sold as slaves by Khmelnytsky's Tartar allies. Between 1648 and 1656, tens of thousands of Jews—given the lack of reliable data, it is impossible to establish more accurate figures—were killed by the rebels, and to this day the Khmelnytsky uprising is considered by Jews to be one of the most traumatic events in their history.

Following the Partitions of Poland by Russia, Prussia, and Austria at the end of the 18th century, most Polish Jews found themselves under Russian rule. In order to restrict the Jews from spreading throughout the Russian Empire and to protect Russian merchants from competition, the Pale of Settlement was established in 1772 by the empress of Russia Catherine II, restricting Jews to the western parts of the empire with the exception of a number of Jews who received permission to live in major cities, such as Kiev and Moscow.

19th and early 20th century

By the end of the 19th century a new type of antisemitism had begun to develop in Europe, racial antisemitism. It started as a part of a broader racist world view and belief of superiority of the "white race" over other "races", while existing prejudice was supported by pseudo-scientific theories such as Social Darwinism.

The main idea of racial antisemitism, as presented by racial theorists such as Joseph Arthur de Gobineau, is that the Jews are a distinct and inferior race compared to the European nations. The emphasis was on the non-European origin and culture of the Jews, meaning they were beyond redemption even if they converted to Christianity. This modern antisemitism emphasized hatred of the Jews as a race and not only due to their Jewish religion.

The rise of modern antisemitism together with the rise of nationalism and the nation state brought a wave of antisemitism as Jews struggled to gain their rights as equal citizens. In Germany, this brought up the Hep-Hep riots in 1819 when the Jews of Bavaria were attacked for claiming their civic rights.

One of the most famous examples of the 19th century was the Dreyfus affair, when a French officer of Jewish origin, Alfred Dreyfus, was accused of high treason in 1894. The trial sparked a wave of antisemitism in France: eventually Dreyfus was found innocent of the charges in 1906. The affair greatly inspired Theodor Herzl.

In eastern Europe, religious antisemitism remained influential as the industrial revolution affected those areas less. During the 19th century and the beginning of the 20th century, a number of pogroms occurred in Russia, sparked by various variables such as antisemitic political movements, the assassination of Tsar Alexander II in 1881 and blood libels about Jews killing Christian children. The most famous blood libel was the Beilis Trial that took place in Kiev in 1903 when a local Jew was found innocent from the accusations of killing a Christian boy.

Another example of modern antisemitism in Europe was the conspiracy theory of Jewish world economic domination, as presented in the hoax The Protocols of the Elders of Zion which was first published in Russia in 1903 and became known outside Russia after the Russian Revolution of 1917. This theory was strengthened by the leading part Jews like the Rothschild family played in the European banking system.

The pogroms in 1881 and after the first Russian Revolution of 1905 cost thousands of Jewish lives and more than a million migrated to America. The second Russian revolution and the civil war that came afterwards sparked a new wave of pogroms against the Jews as nationalist militias and regular armies fought over the control of the country. The casualties from the pogroms were estimated in tens of thousands dead.

The Holocaust

The Holocaust was among the most significant events in modern Jewish history and one of the largest genocides in the history of the world. Approximately six million Jews were murdered by the Nazis, accounting for roughly 2/3 of all European Jews.

By the early 20th century, the Jews of Germany were the most integrated Jews in Europe. Their situation changed in the early 1930s after the German defeat in World War I and the economic crisis of 1929, which resulted in the rise of the Nazis and their explicitly antisemitic program. Hate speech which referred to Jewish citizens as "dirty Jews" became common in antisemitic pamphlets and newspapers such as the Völkischer Beobachter and Der Stürmer Additionally, blame was laid on Jews for having caused Germany's defeat in World War I (see Dolchstosslegende).

The Nazi antisemitic program quickly expanded beyond mere speech. Starting in 1933, repressive laws were passed against Jews, culminating in the 1935 Nuremberg Laws which removed most of the rights of citizenship from Jews, using a racial definition that was based on descent, rather than a definition which was based on religion. Sporadic violence against Jews became widespread during the Kristallnacht riots in 1938, which targeted Jewish homes, businesses, and places of worship, killing 91 across Germany and Austria.

With the Nazi invasion of Poland in 1939 and the beginning of World War II, the Nazis began the extermination of Jews in Europe. The Jews were concentrated in ghettos and later they were sent to concentration and death camps where they were immediately or eventually murdered. In the occupied territories of the USSR, Jews were murdered by death squads, sometimes with the help of locally recruited units. This practice was later replaced by gassing the Jews in the death camps; the largest of these was Auschwitz.

After 1945
With the end of World War II in 1945, surviving Jews began to return to their homes although many chose to emigrate to the United States, Great Britain, and British-controlled Palestine. To some extent, the antisemitism of the Nazi regime continued in different guises. Claims of blood libel and persecution of Jews continued, in part due to fear that returning Jews would attempt to reclaim property stolen during the Holocaust or expose assistance given by elements of the local population in previously Nazi-occupied territories. An example was the Kielce pogrom, which occurred in 1946 in Poland when citizens violently attacked Jews based on a false accusation of the kidnapping of a Christian child.

The postwar period also witnessed a rise in antisemitic persecution in the USSR. In 1948, Stalin launched the campaign against the "rootless cosmopolitan" in which numerous Yiddish-language poets, writers, painters, and sculptors were killed or arrested. This culminated in the Doctors' Plot, issued between 1952 and 1953, during which a number of Jewish doctors were arrested and accused of attempting to murder leading party leaders. Modern historian Edvard Radzinsky has also suggested that Stalin planned to deport the Jewish population of the USSR to exile in Kazakhstan or Siberia.

21st century

Antisemitism has increased significantly in Europe since 2000, with increases in verbal attacks and vandalism such as graffiti, fire bombings of Jewish schools, and desecration of synagogues and cemeteries. Those incidents took place not only in France and Germany, but also in Belgium, Austria, and the United Kingdom. In those countries, physical assaults against Jews including beatings, stabbings, and other violence, increased markedly, in a number of cases resulting in serious injury and even death. Moreover, the Netherlands and Sweden have also had consistently high rates of antisemitic attacks since 2000. A 2015 report by the US State Department on religious freedom declared that "European anti-Israel sentiment crossed the line into anti-Semitism."

This rise in antisemitic attacks is associated on the one hand with the Muslim antisemitism (described below) and on the other hand with the rise of far-right political parties as a result of the economic crisis of 2008. The number of antisemitic political parties in European parliaments rose from one to three during 2012 and a survey in ten European countries revealed high levels of antisemitic attitudes. Greece's neo-Nazi party, Golden Dawn, won 21 seats in parliament, although these had all been lost by 2019.

In Eastern Europe antisemitism in the 21st century continued on a similar scale to the 1990s. The dissolution of the Soviet Union and the instability of the new states has brought the rise of nationalist movements and accusations against Jews of responsibility for the economic crisis, controlling local businesses and bribing the government, alongside traditional and religious motives for antisemitism (blood libels for example).  Most of the antisemitic incidents are against Jewish cemeteries and buildings (community centers and synagogues). Nevertheless, there were several violent attacks against Jews in Moscow in 2006 when a neo-Nazi stabbed nine people at the Bolshaya Bronnaya Synagogue, the failed bomb attack on the same synagogue in 1999, the threats against Jewish pilgrims in Uman, Ukraine and the attack against a menorah by extremist Christian organization in Moldova in 2009. In 2008, the radical Svoboda (Freedom) party of Ukraine captured more than 10% of the popular vote, giving electoral support to a party well known for its antisemitic rhetoric. They joined the ranks of Jobbik, an openly antisemitic party, in the Hungarian parliament. This rise in the support for far-right ideas in western and eastern Europe has resulted in the increase of antisemitic acts, mostly attacks on Jewish memorials, synagogues and cemeteries but also a number of physical attacks against Jews.

Muslim Europeans
A 2005 French study showed that anti-Jewish prejudice was more prevalent among religious Muslims than among non-religious ones; 46% expressed antisemitic sentiments compared to 30% of non-practising Muslims in France. Only 28% of the religious Muslims were found to be totally without such prejudice. The few studies available which had been conducted among Muslim youth in various western European countries showed some similar outcomes. A 2011 study of elementary school children in Dutch-language schools in Brussels by a Belgian sociologist showed that about 50 percent of Muslim students in second and third grade could be considered antisemites, versus 10% of others. Also in 2011, Gunther Jikeli published findings from 117 interviews with 19-year-old Muslim youths in Berlin, Paris, and London, the majority of whom voiced antisemitic feelings.

Participants in the antisemitic riots outside the Israeli embassy in 2009 were said to be mainly Muslim youth, supported by left-wing autonomous Blitz activists.

Terrorists have been involved in some violent attacks on Jews. In 2012 in Toulouse, armed terrorist Mohammed Merah, the child of Muslim parents from Algeria, murdered four Jews. Merah had previously targeted French army soldiers. A brother of the shooter, Abdelghani Merah, said he and his siblings had been brought up on antisemitic views espoused by their parents.

Public opinion polls
The summary of a 2004 poll by the "Pew Global Attitudes Project" noted, "Despite concerns about rising antisemitism in Europe, there are no indications that anti-Jewish sentiment has increased over the past decade. Favorable ratings of Jews are actually higher now in France, Germany, and Russia than they were in 1991. Nonetheless, Jews are better liked in the U.S. than in Germany and Russia."

According to 2005 survey results by the Anti-Defamation League, antisemitic attitudes remain common in Europe. Over 30% of those surveyed believed that Jews have too much power in business, with responses ranging from lows of 11% in Denmark and 14% in England to highs of 66% in Hungary, and over 40% in Poland and Spain. The results of religious antisemitism also persist and over 20% of European respondents agreed that Jews were responsible for the death of Jesus, with France having the lowest percentage at 13% and Poland having the highest number of those agreeing, at 39%.

A 2006 study in the Journal of Conflict Resolution found that although almost no respondents in countries of the European Union regarded themselves as antisemitic, antisemitic attitudes correlated with anti-Israel opinions. Looking at populations in 10 European countries, Charles A. Small and Edward H. Kaplan surveyed 5,000 respondents, asking them about Israeli actions and classical antisemitic stereotypes. The surveys asked questions about whether people thought that the IDF purposely targets children or poisons the Palestinian water supplies. The study found that "people who believed the anti-Israel mythologies also tended to believe that Jews are not honest in business, have dual loyalties, control government and the economy, and the like." The study found anti-Israel respondents were 56% more likely to be antisemitic than the average European.

According to a poll conducted by the Anti-Defamation League (ADL) in 2012, antisemitic attitudes in ten European countries remain at "disturbingly high levels", peaking in Eastern Europe and Spain, with large swaths of the population subscribing to classical antisemitic notions such as Jews having too much power in business, being more loyal to Israel than their own country, or "talking too much" about what happened during the Holocaust. In comparison with a similar ADL poll conducted in 2009, several of the countries showed high levels in the overall level of antisemitism, while other countries experienced more modest increases:
 Austria: Experienced a slight decrease to 28 percent from 30 percent in 2009.
 France: The overall level of antisemitism increased to 24 percent of the population, up from 20 percent in 2009.
 Germany: antisemitism increased by one percentage point, to 21 percent of the population.
 Hungary: The level rose to 63 percent of the population, compared with 47 percent in 2009.
 Poland: The number remained unchanged, with 48 percent of the population showing deep-seated antisemitic attitudes.
 Spain: Fifty-three percent (53%) percent of the population, compared to 48 percent in 2009.
 United Kingdom: antisemitic attitudes jumped to 17 percent of the population, compared to 10 percent in 2009.
In January 2019 the European Commission published a survey of 28 countries which showed a wide gap in perceptions between Jews and non-Jews in Europe. 89% of the Jews surveyed thought that antisemitism had "significantly increased" over the last five years, whereas only 36% of non-Jews believed the same.

Eastern and Central Europe
Polling data taken in 2015-2016 shows the following results regarding the proportions of Christians in the following countries who would reject Jews as family members, neighbors or citizens.

By country

Armenia
A major source of antisemitism in Armenia is Israel's strong relations with and arms sales to Azerbaijan. During the 2020 Nagorno-Karabakh War, Nagorno-Karabakh president Arayik Harutyunyan accused Israel of complicity in a 'genocide' against Armenians. Armenians in Lebanon burned the Israeli flag, along with the Turkish and Azerbaijani flags at a protest during that war.

In April 1998, Igor Muradyan, a famous Armenian political analyst and economist, published an antisemitic article in one of Armenia's leading newspapers Voice of Armenia. Muradyan claimed that the history of Armenian-Jewish relations has been filled with "Aryans vs. Semites" conflict manifestations. He accused Jews of inciting ethnic conflicts, including the dispute over Nagorno-Karabagh and demonstrated concern for Armenia's safety in light of Israel's good relations with Turkey.

In 2002, a book entitled National System (written by Romen Yepiskoposyan in Armenian and Russian) was printed and presented at the Union of Writers of Armenia. In that book, Jews (along with Turks) are identified as number-one enemies of Armenians and are described as "the nation-destroyer with a mission of destruction and decomposition." A section in the book entitled The Greatest Falsification of the 20th Century denies the Holocaust, claiming that it is a myth created by Zionists to discredit "Aryans": "The greatest falsification in human history is the myth of Holocaust.... no one was killed in gas chambers. There were no gas chambers."

Similar accusations were voiced by Armen Avetissian, the leader of the small ultra-nationalist party, Armenian Aryan Order (AAO), on 11 February 2002, when he also called for the Israeli ambassador Rivka Kohen to be declared persona non-grata in Armenia for Israel's refusal to give the Armenian massacres of 1915 equal status with the Holocaust. In addition, he asserted that the number of victims of the Holocaust has been overstated. In 2004, Armen Avetissian expressed extremist remarks against Jews in several issues of the AAO run The Armeno-Aryan newspaper, as well as during a number of meetings and press conferences. As a result, his party was excluded from the Armenian Nationalist Front. He was arrested in January 2005 on charges of inciting ethnic hatred.

Shortly after, during a prime time talk show, the leader of the People's Party and the owner of ALM television channel, Tigran Karapetyan, accused Jews of assisting Ottoman authorities in the 1915 Armenian Genocide. His interviewee, Armen Avetissian stated that "the Armenian Aryans intend to fight against the Jewish-Masonic aggression and will do what it takes to repress evil in its own nest." Speaking about Armenia's Jewish community Avetissian said that it consists of "700 of those who identify themselves as Jews and 50,000 of those whom the Aryans will soon reveal while cleansing the country of Jewish evil." The Jewish Council of Armenia addressed its concerns to the government and various human rights organizations demanding to stop promoting ethnic hatred and to ban ALM. However, these demands were mostly disregarded.

On 23 October 2004, the head of the Department for Ethnic and Religious Minority Issues, Hranoush Kharatyan, publicly commented on so-called "Judaist" xenophobia in Armenia. She said: "Why are we not responding to the fact that on their Friday gatherings, Judaists continue to advocate hatred towards all non-Judaists as far as comparing the latter to cattle and propagating spitting on them?" Kharatyan also accused local Jews of calling for "anti-Christian actions."

The Jewish Council of Armenia sent an open letter to President Robert Kocharian expressing its deep concern with the recent rise of antisemitism. Armen Avetissian responded to this by publishing yet another antisemitic article in the Iravunq newspaper, where he stated: "Any country that has a Jewish minority is under big threat in terms of stability." Later while meeting with the Chairman of the National Assembly of Armenia Artur Baghdasarian, head of the Jewish Council of Armenia Rima Varzhapetian insisted that the government took steps to prevent further acts of antisemitism. Avetissian was arrested on 24 January 2005. Several prominent academic figures, such as Levon Ananyan (the head of the Writers union of Armenia) and composer Ruben Hakhverdian supported Avetissian and called upon the authorities to release him. In their demands to release him they were joined by opposition deputies and ombudsman Larisa Alaverdyan as the authorities had arrested him for political speech.

In September 2006, while criticizing the American Global Gold corporation, Armenian Minister of Environment Vardan Ayvazyan said during a press conference: "Do you know who you are defending? You are defending kikes! Go over their [company headquarters] and find out who is behind this company and if we should let them come here!" After Rimma Varzhapetian's protests, Aivazian claimed he did not mean to offend Jews, and that such criticism was intended strictly for the Global Gold company.

On 23 December 2007, The Jewish Holocaust Memorial in central Yerevan was vandalized by unknown individuals. A Nazi swastika symbol was scratched and black paint was splattered on the simple stone. After notifying the local police, Rabbi Gershon Burshtein, a Chabad emissary who serves as Chief Rabbi of the country's tiny Jewish community said "I just visited the memorial the other day and everything was fine. This is terrible, as there are excellent relations between Jews and Armenians." The monument has been defaced and toppled several times in the past. It is located in the city's Aragast Park, a few blocks north of the centrally located Republic Square, which is home to a number of government buildings.

On 12 February 2021, the Holocaust Memorial in Yerevan was once again vandalized.

Austria

Antisemitism has a long history in Austria, typically focused on the large presence of Jews in Vienna. The Jews were systematically destroyed 1938–1945.

Evidences of the presence of Jewish communities in the geographical area today covered by Austria can be traced back to the 12th century. In 1848 Jews were granted civil rights and the right to establish an autonomous religious community, but full citizenship rights were given only in 1867. In an atmosphere of economic, religious, and social freedom, the Jewish population grew from 6,000 in 1860 to almost 185,000 in 1938. In March 1938, Austria was annexed by Nazi Germany and thousands of Austrian Jews were sent to concentration camps. Of the 65,000 Viennese Jews deported to concentration camps, only about 2,000 survived, while around 800 survived World War II in hiding. In the Habsburg Empire, the antisemitic movement was strongly concentrated on Vienna.
 
Antisemitism did not cease to exist in the aftermath of World War II and continued to be part of Austrian political life and culture with its strongest hold in the political parties and the media. Bernd Marin, an Austrian sociologist, has characterized antisemitism in Austria after 1945 as an 'antisemitism without Jews', since Jews constituted only 0.1 percent of the Austrian population. Antisemitism was stronger in those areas where Jews no longer lived and where previously practically no Jews had lived, and among people who neither have had nor have any personal contact with Jews.

Since post-war prejudice against Jews has been publicly forbidden and tabooed, antisemitism was actually 'antisemitism without antisemites', but different expressions of it were to be found in the Austrian polities. During the 1980s, the taboo against open expressions of explicitly antisemitic beliefs has remained, but the means of circumventing it linguistically have extended its boundaries in such a way that the taboo itself appears to have lost some of its significance. Anti-Jewish prejudices which had remained hidden began to surface and were increasingly found in public settings. Thus, verbal antisemitism was rarely expressed directly, but rather used coded expressions, which reflected one of the country's major characteristics – ambivalence and ambiguity toward its past.

Today the Jewish community of Austria consists of about 8,000 persons.

Contemporary antisemitism was reported from Serfaus during 2009 and 2010. Several hotels and apartments in the renowned holiday resort have confirmed a policy of not allowing Jews on their premises. Bookings are tried to be detected in advance based on racial profiling, and are denied to possible orthodox Jews.

Belgium

Over a hundred antisemitic attacks were recorded in Belgium in 2009, a 100% increase from the year before. The perpetrators were usually young males of immigrant Muslim backgrounds from the Middle East. In 2009, the Belgian city of Antwerp, often referred to as Europe's last shtetl, experienced a surge in antisemitic violence. Bloeme Evers-Emden, an Amsterdam resident and Auschwitz survivor, was quoted in the newspaper Aftenposten in 2010: "The antisemitism now is even worse than before the Holocaust. The antisemitism has become more violent. Now they are threatening to kill us."

The behavior prompted by the 2012 local elections in the municipality of Schaarbeek impelled the president of the Coordination Committee of Jewish Organizations in Belgium, Maurice Sosnowski, to observe that "'candidates who belonged to the Jewish community were attacked for their affiliation' and the municipality saw a 'hate campaign under the pretext of anti-Zionism.'"
Several other incidents occurred in 2012- in November Demonstrators at an anti-Israel rally in Antwerp rally chanted "Hamas, Hamas, all Jews to the gas." In October, a synagogue in Brussels was vandalized by two unidentified male perpetrators who spray-painted "death to the Jews" and "boom" on the wall.

The increased frequency of antisemitic attacks started in May 2014, when four people were killed in a shooting at the Belgian Jewish Museum in Brussels. Two days later, a young Muslim man entered the CCU (Jewish Cultural Center) while an event was taking place and shouted racist slurs. A month later, a school bus in Antwerp, that was driving five-year-old Jewish children was stoned by a group of Muslim teens. Towards the end of August 2014, a 75-year-old Jewish woman was hit and pushed to the ground because of her Jewish-sounding surname.

In 2020 Israel asked that the Carnaval parade in Aalst be canceled because of antisemitism.

Bulgaria

Antisemitism became a political force in Bulgaria in the late 19th century.  In World War II the community of about 50,000 was largely protected when King Boris III  refused to hand over the Jews to the Nazis. After the war most went to Israel.

There are about 2,000 Jews still living in Bulgaria today.  In early 2019, an incident occurred in Bulgaria where rocks were thrown at a synagogue in Sofia, Bulgaria's capital city. Though no one was hurt, the incident occurred only a short time after antisemitic graffiti was found on a monument for victims of Bulgaria's communist regime, which ruled Bulgaria from 1945 to 1989.

Czech Republic
The Czech lands are known for having less antisemitism than surrounding countries are, despite occasional flare-ups of it such as the 1899 Hilsner Affair.  In the late 19th century Czech nationalists were sharply critical of conservative Jews who supported the German government based in Vienna., and also the radical Jews who organized a socialist party in Prague. After 1919 Tomáš Garrigue Masaryk, the first president of Czechoslovakia, strongly opposed antisemitism. He left office in 1935 and subsequently there was increasing hostility.

In 2019, Associated Press reported that antisemitism was on the rise, especially from far-right, pro-Russian elements: two physical attacks and three instances of vandalism were reported.

Denmark

Antisemitism in Denmark has not been as widespread as in other countries. Initially, Jews were banned as in other countries in Europe, but beginning in the 17th century, Jews were allowed to live in Denmark freely, unlike in other European countries where they were forced to live in ghettos.

In 1819 a series of anti-Jewish riots in Germany spread to several neighboring countries including Denmark, resulting in mob attacks on Jews in Copenhagen and many provincial towns. These riots were known as Hep! Hep! Riots, from the derogatory rallying cry against the Jews in Germany. Riots lasted for five months during which time shop windows were smashed, stores looted, homes attacked, and Jews physically abused.

2011, 2012, and 2013 averaged around 43 antisemitic incidents a year, which included assault and physical harassment, threats, Antisemitic utterances, and vandalism. In July 2014, during the Gaza War, there was an increase in antisemitic rhetoric as death threats were expressed against Jews in Denmark. In February 2015, a Jewish man was killed and two police officers were injured during a shooting outside the main synagogue of Copenhagen.

In 2017 an imam in Copenhagen called during Friday prayers for the slaughter of all Jews, citing a hadith. The Middle East Media Research Institute translated parts of his speech, warning the Jewish community in Denmark, who reported the imam to Danish police officials.

Recent efforts to outlaw infant circumcision for non-medical reasons have been characterized as motivated by xenophobia in general or antisemitism in particular. Jonatan Cohn, leader of AKVAH (Department of Mapping and Knowledge-sharing of Antisemitic Events, a department of ), describes the proposal as the main thing that "destroys the night sleep of Jewish Danes", more so than antisemitism among "young Muslim men", and goes on to say that

Iman Diab and Güray Baba, members of Intact Denmark with a self-described "minority background", report being accused of being "antisemites, traitors, persecutors of minority parents" due to their involvement in the circumcision debate.

Estonia

France

21st-century France

Trends
Despite the fact that a large majority of French people have favorable attitudes towards Jews, acts of anti-Jewish violence, property destruction, and racist language are a serious cause for concern. A majority of reported hate crimes in France are antisemitic hate crimes. According to French Prime Minister Manuel Valls: "We have the old anti-Semitism ... that comes from the extreme right, but [a] new anti-Semitism comes from the difficult neighborhoods, from immigrants from the Middle East and North Africa." The most intense acts of antisemitism are perpetrated by Muslims of Arab or African heritage.

According to a 2006 poll by the Pew Global Attitudes Project, 71% of French Muslims have positive views of Jews, the highest percentage in the world. According to the National Advisory Committee on Human Rights, antisemitic acts account for a majority— 72% in all in 2003— of racist acts in France. 40% of racist violence perpetrated in France in 2013 targeted the Jewish minority, despite the fact that Jews represent less than 1% of the French population.

With the start of the Second Intifada, antisemitic incidents increased in France. In 2002, the Commission nationale consultative des droits de l'homme (Human Rights Commission) reported six times more antisemitic incidents than in 2001 (193 incidents in 2002). The commission's statistics showed that antisemitic acts constituted 62% of all racist acts in the country (compared to 45% in 2001 and 80% in 2000). The report documented 313 violent acts against people or property, including 38 injuries and the murder of someone with Maghrebin origins by far-right skinheads.

About 7,000 French Jews moved to Israel in 2014.  This was 1% of the entire French Jewish population and a record number since World War II. Conversations within the European Jewish community indicate that antisemitic attacks in France are the impetus for the high emigration figures. French Prime Minister Manuel Valls expressed his concern about the trend: "If 100,000 French people of Spanish origin were to leave, I would never say that France is not France anymore.  But if 100,000 Jews leave, France will no longer be France.  The French Republic will be judged a failure." The trend of increased emigration continued into 2015 due to a rise in assaults and intimidation by Muslim extremists. Emigration levels declined in each year from 2015 through 2020.

Incidents
Ilan Halimi (1982 – 13 February 2006) was a young French Jew (of Moroccan parentage) kidnapped on 21 January 2006 by a group of youth called the Gang of Barbarians and subsequently tortured to death over a period of three weeks. The murder, amongst whose motives authorities include antisemitism, incited a public outcry in a France already marked by intense public controversy about the role of children of immigrants in its society.

On 19 March 2012, Mohammed Merah shot and killed three Jewish children and a rabbi at the Ozar Hatorah School in Toulouse, France. He was later killed during a raid by the French police on his house. Merah was also inspired by al-Qaeda. Following the murders, the Ozar Hatorah school was targeted by antisemitic hate mail and calls.

In July 2012, a French Jewish teenager wearing a "distinctive religious symbol" was the victim of a violent antisemitic attack on a train traveling between Toulouse and Lyon.  The teen was first verbally harassed and later beaten up by two assailants.  The French Jewish umbrella group, CRIF, called the attack "another development in the worrying trend of antisemitism in our country."

Another incident in July 2012 dealt with the vandalism of the synagogue of Noisy-le-Grand of the Seine-Saint-Denis district in Paris.  The synagogue was vandalized three times in a ten-day period.  Prayer books and shawls were thrown on the floor, windows were shattered, drawers were ransacked, and vandalized the walls, tables, clocks, and floors.  The authorities were alerted of the incidents by the Bureau National de Vigilance Contr L'Antisemtisme (BNVCA), a French antisemitism watchdog group, which called for more measures to be taken to prevent future hate crimes. BNVCA President Sammy Ghozlan stated that "Despite the measures taken, things persist, and I think that we need additional legislation because the Jewish community is annoyed."

In June 2014, Following the threats facing Jews in France, particularly arising from French-born jihadists returning after fighting in the civil war in Syria, French President Francois Hollande met with an international delegation of Jewish leaders. The French president outlined steps that have been taken to protect the Jewish community, especially Jewish schools, from attacks and growing antisemitism. He was quoted saying that: "We would like to set an example to the world in fighting anti-Semitism," he said, but conceded the current situation – following a murderous attack by a French-born terrorist in Belgium – bespoke a "new, heavy context."

In July 2014, dozens of young men protesting Israel's actions in Gaza (following the Protective Edge military operation) briefly besieged a Paris synagogue and clashed with security. At least three Jews were taken to the hospital as a result of the clashes that erupted between the protesters and young Jewish men who guarded the Don Isaac Abravanel Synagogue in Paris, a witness told JTA. The attackers splintered off an anti-Israel demonstration and advanced toward the synagogue when it was full. When the demonstrators arrived at the central Paris synagogue, the five police officers on guard blocked the entrance as the protesters chanted antisemitic slogans and hurled objects at the synagogue and the guards. Nearly 200 congregants were inside. The mob was kept away by men from the SPCJ Jewish security unit, the Jewish Defense League, and Beitar, who engaged the attackers in what turned into a street brawl. Later, after rioters failed to burn the synagogue down, they instead burned cars and destroyed Jewish-owned properties in the a largely Jewish area of Sarcelles.

In December 2014, armed assailants broke into a suburban Paris residence of a Jewish couple, raped the woman while her husband was kept at bay, and robbed the couple. According to a friend of the victims, one of the assailants said the woman during the robbery "Tell us where you hide the money. You Jews always have money." Prime Minister of France Manuel Valls condemned the attack as vile and said that it demonstrated that the fight against antisemitism is a daily struggle. Valls also expressed support for the victims' families. Interior Minister Bernard Cazeneuve said in a statement that the "antisemitic nature of the attack seems proven," saying that the assailants "started with the idea that being Jewish means having money."

In January 2015, a friend of the perpetrators of the Charlie Hebdo shooting, attacked a kosher market in a Jewish area of Paris and took those inside as hostages. He killed four hostages.  The CRIF responded, "These French citizens were struck down in a cold-blooded manner and mercilessly because they were Jews".

In October 2015, a rabbi and two Jewish worshippers were stabbed in an attack outside a synagogue in Marseilles. In November the teacher of a Jewish school in that city was stabbed by three people professing support for ISIS.

Germany

From the early Middle Ages to the 18th century, Jews in Germany were subjected to many persecutions but they also enjoyed brief periods of tolerance. Though the 19th century began with a series of riots and pogroms against the Jews, emancipation followed in 1848, so that, by the early 20th century, the Jews in Germany were the most integrated Jews in Europe. The situation changed in the early 1930s with the rise of the Nazis and their explicitly antisemitic program. Hate speech which referred to Jewish citizens as "dirty Jews" became common in antisemitic pamphlets and newspapers such as the Völkischer Beobachter and Der Stürmer. Additionally, blame was laid on Jews for having caused Germany's defeat in World War I (see Dolchstosslegende).

Anti-Jewish propaganda expanded rapidly. Nazi cartoons that depicted "dirty Jews" frequently portrayed a dirty, physically unattractive, and badly dressed "Talmudic" Jew in traditional religious garments similar to those which are worn by Hasidic Jews. Articles attacking Jews, while concentrating on the commercial and political activities of prominent Jews, also frequently attacked them based on religious dogmas, such as the blood libel.

Nazi Germany

The Nazi antisemitic program quickly expanded beyond mere speech. Starting in 1933, repressive laws were passed against Jews, culminating in the Nuremberg Laws which removed most of the rights of citizenship from Jews, using a racial definition that was based on descent, rather than a religious definition which determined who was a Jew. Sporadic violence against the Jews became widespread during the Kristallnacht riots, which targeted Jewish homes, businesses and places of worship, killing hundreds across Germany and Austria. The antisemitic agenda culminated in the genocide of the Jews of Europe, known as the Holocaust.

In 1998, Ignatz Bubis said that Jews could not live freely in Germany. In 2002, the historian Julius Schoeps said that "resolutions by the German parliament to reject antisemitism are drivel of the worst kind" and "all those ineffective actions are presented to the world as a strong defense against the charge of antisemitism. The truth is: no one is really interested in these matters. No one really cares."

21st-century Germany

A 2012 poll showed that 18% of the Turks in Germany think of Jews as inferior human beings. A similar study found that most of Germany's native-born Muslim youth and children of immigrants have antisemitic views.

In 2014, antisemitic activities in Germany prompted German Chancellor Angela Merkel to lead a rally in Berlin against antisemitism in Germany. In that same year, about 3,500 people rallied in front of the Frankfurt City Hall to protest against a wave of antisemitic incidents in Germany.  A few hundred of the protesters were from the Kurdish-Israeli Friendship Association.  According to the JTA, "Merkel expressed her support for the event in a letter."
In May 2016, a new definition of antisemitism was agreed upon at the Berlin-based International Holocaust Remembrance Alliance (IHRA) Conference, stating that "holding Jews collectively responsible for actions of the state of Israel" is antisemitic.

In January 2017, a German court in the city of Wuppertal upheld the 2015 decision of a lower court which deemed an attempt by three Muslim attackers (German Palestinians) to burn down a synagogue in 2014 (on the anniversary of Kristallnacht) to be a means of "drawing attention to the Gaza conflict" with Israel, despite the fact that attacks on Jews and Jewish institutions as a result of the actions of the state of Israel amounts to collective punishment and a form of antisemitism. The offenders were not sent to prison. The German regional court ruled that the actions of the three perpetrators were governed by anti-Israelism and not antisemitism, while the attackers received suspended sentences.

Green Party MP Volker Beck protested the ruling, saying: "This is a decision as far as the motives of the perpetrators are concerned. What do Jews in Germany have to do with the Middle East conflict? Every bit as much as Christians, non-religious people, or Muslims in Germany, namely, absolutely nothing. The ignorance of the judiciary toward antisemitism is for many Jews in Germany especially alarming." Dr. Moshe Kantor, president of the European Jewish Congress (EJC), said: "It is unbelievable that attempts to burn a synagogue have been equated with displeasure of Israeli government policies." "This has now given a carte blanche to anti-Semites across Germany to attack Jews because a German court has given them a ready justification."

A 2017 study on Jewish perspectives on antisemitism in Germany by Bielefeld University found that individuals and groups belonging to the extreme right and extreme left were equally represented as perpetrators of antisemitic harassment and assault, while a large part of the attacks was committed by Muslim assailants. The study also found that 70% of the participants feared a rise in antisemitism due to immigration citing the antisemitic views of the refugees.

In February 2019, crime data released by the government for 2018 and published in Der Tagesspiegel showed a yearly increase of 10%, with 1,646 crimes linked to a hatred of Jews in 2018, with the totals not finalised as yet. There was a 60% rise in physical attacks (62 violent incidents, compared to 37 in 2017).

On 9 October 2019, a neo-Nazi gunman tried to enter a synagogue in Halle during Yom Kippur services. Although the attacker was unsuccessful, he shot two people nearby dead. The incident was live-streamed.

As of 2020, antisemitic crimes in Germany reached their highest level since Germany began keeping statistics.

Antisemitic accusations can also be demonstrated in investment contexts. A study has shown that investors with a German name perceived as Jewish are judged to be significantly more immoral than people with a German name perceived as non-Jewish.

Greece

Antisemitism has remained a significant issue in Greece. The Greek economic crisis was one of the main factors in the rise in the scope of antisemitic incidents and the rise of Greece's neo-Nazi party, Golden Dawn, which won 21 seats in parliament in 2012.

In recent years a number of events of vandalism have occurred throughout the country – in 2002, 2003, and 2010, the Holocaust memorial in Thessaloniki was vandalized, in 2009 the Jewish cemetery in Ioannina was attacked several times and in the same year, the Jewish cemetery in Athens was also attacked. In 2012 in Rhodes, the city's Holocaust monument was spray-painted with swastikas.

Hungary

Hungary was the first country after Nazi Germany that passed anti-Jewish laws.  In 1939, all the Hungarian Jews were registered. In June 1944, Hungarian police deported nearly 440,000 Jews in more than 145 trains, mostly to Auschwitz.

Antisemitism in Hungary is manifested mainly in far-right publications and demonstrations. Hungarian Justice and Life Party supporters continued their tradition of shouting antisemitic slogans and tearing the US flag to shreds at their annual rallies in Budapest in March 2003 and 2004, commemorating the 1848–1849 revolution. Further, during the demonstrations held to celebrate the anniversary of the 1956 uprising, a post-Communist tradition celebrated by the left and right of the political spectrum, antisemitic and anti-Israel slogans were heard from the right wing, such as accusing Israel of war crimes. The center-right traditionally keeps its distance from the right-wing Csurka-led and other far-right demonstrations.

In 2012, a survey conducted by the Anti-Defamation League found that 63% of the Hungarian population holds antisemitic attitudes.

Ireland
A two-year boycott of Limerick's Jewish community was instigated by Catholic priest John Creagh in 1904, who claimed that Jews "came to our land to fasten themselves on us like leeches and to draw our blood".

A 2007 survey found that 20% of Irish people wanted Israelis to be barred from becoming naturalized Irish citizens while 11% were against the naturalization of Jews. Opposition to accepting a Jew into the family was slightly stronger among 18- to 25-year-olds.

Italy

A 2012 survey by the Anti-Defamation League (ADL), of five European countries in regard to antisemitism included Italy. Of those surveyed:
 23% of Italians harbor strong antisemitic views
 58% of Italians believe Italian Jews are more loyal to Israel than Italy.
 40% believe that Jews have too much power in international financial markets, which is also defined as antisemitism by the European Union.
 29% say Jews don't care about anyone but their own kind.
 27% of Italians say that Jews are more willing than others to use shady practices to get what they want.
 43% believe Jews still talk too much about the Holocaust.

On 15 March 2012, Italian police arrested a Muslim man of Moroccan background who attempted to blow up a synagogue. According to ANSA English:

"police arrested a suspected terrorist who they believe may have been planning an attack on Milan's synagogue.
Police said they found evidence on the man's computer that he has conducted a thorough inspection of Milan's synagogue, with information on the security measures used and the police who guard the building. Investigators added that they had intercepted messages in which the man talked about a "jihad mission". They said he was identified as a suspect terrorist during monitoring of websites that feature forums and publish documents on the 'jihad'.

On 12 November 2015, a Jewish man was stabbed multiple times near a pizza shop in Milan by an Arab assailant.

Latvia

Two desecrations of Holocaust memorials, in Jelgava and in the Biķernieki Forest, took place in 1993. The delegates of the World Congress of Latvian Jews who came to Biķernieki to commemorate the 46,500 Jews shot there, were shocked by the sight of swastikas and the word  daubed on the memorial. Furthermore, Articles of antisemitic content appeared in the Latvian nationalist press. The main topics of these articles were the collaboration of Jews with the Communists in the Soviet period, Jews tarnishing Latvia's good name in the West, and Jewish businessmen striving to control the Latvian economy.

Netherlands

The Netherlands has the second highest incidence of antisemitic incidents in the European Union.  However, it is difficult to obtain exact figures because the specific groups against whom attacks are made are not specifically identified in police reports, and analyses of police data for antisemitism, therefore, rely on keyword searches, e.g. Jew or Israel.  According to Centre for Information and Documentation on Israel (CIDI), a pro-Israel lobby group in the Netherlands, the number of antisemitic incidents reported in the whole of the Netherlands was 108 in 2008, 93 in 2009, and 124 in 2010. Some two-thirds of this are acts of aggression.  There are approximately 52 000 Dutch Jews.

According to the NRC Handelsblad newspaper, the number of antisemitic incidents in Amsterdam was 14 in 2008 and 30 in 2009. In 2010, Raphaël Evers, an orthodox rabbi in Amsterdam, told the Norwegian newspaper Aftenposten that Jews can no longer be safe in the city anymore due to the risk of violent assaults. "We Jews no longer feel at home here in the Netherlands.  Many people talk about moving to Israel," he said. In 2013, the Dutch Center for Reports on Discrimination (CIDI) noted that there is more antisemitism on the Internet than ever before in its 17-year history.

In September 2013, Dutch politician Robbert Baruch was accused of using "Jews' tricks" in his campaign for the European Parliament. In September 2014, a hostile rider on a motorized scooter almost hit a Dutch Jew walking down a street in the Hague because he was openly wearing a yarmulke (kippah), while other Muslim passersby called him a "cancer." In October 2014, a Jewish man was advised by the authorities in the Hague not to host a sukkah at his own home during the Jewish holiday of Sukkot because it would offend Muslims and attract vandalism.  He lived in an area of the Hague that currently has a large Islamic population, although it was originally a Jewish neighborhood.  The Jewish man was verbally abused when he wore a yarmulke in public.

In March 2015, it was reported that a Dutch school no longer taught about the Holocaust due to the large number of Muslim students who refused to be taught about the subject. At a roundtable discussion with teachers and other educators that was held by the ChristianUnion party, Arie Slob, the party's parliamentary leader, stated that Holocaust survivors are no longer asked to speak at many Dutch schools while adding that "I am horrified by this. It is unacceptable that 70 years after the Holocaust, anti-Semitism in the Netherlands is growing." Wissam Feriani, a social studies teacher (who is himself a Muslim), recounted his experiences: "The teacher says Jews, the pupils say Gaza. The teacher says Holocaust, the pupils say it's all bullshit...It's always the Jews' fault. Some pupils say they [Jews] don't belong. It's difficult."

In April 2019, a pro-Israel demonstrator standing near an anti-Israel rally was beaten in Amsterdam.

Norway

Jews were prohibited from living or entering Norway by paragraph 2 (known as the Jew clause in Norway) of the 1814 Constitution, which originally read, "The evangelical-Lutheran religion remains the public religion of the State. Those inhabitants, who confess thereto, are bound to raise their children to the same. Jesuits and monastic orders are not permitted. Jews are still prohibited from entry to the Realm." In 1851 the last sentence was struck out. Monks were permitted in 1897, and Jesuits not before 1956.

The Jew Clause was reinstated 13 March 1942 by Vidkun Quisling during Germany's occupation of Norway, but was reversed when Norway was liberated in May 1945. Before the deportation of Danish Jews, there were 2,173 Jews in Norway, at least 775 of whom were arrested, detained, and/or deported; 765 died as a direct result of the Holocaust. After the war and following a legal purge, Quisling was convicted of high treason (including the unlawful change of the Constitution) and shot by a firing squad.

In 2010, the Norwegian Broadcasting Corporation after one year of research, revealed that antisemitism was common among Norwegian Muslims. Teachers at schools with large shares of Muslims revealed that Muslim students often "praise or admire Adolf Hitler for his killing of Jews", that "Jew-hate is legitimate within vast groups of Muslim students" and that "Muslims laugh or command [teachers] to stop when trying to educate about the Holocaust".

Additionally that "while some students might protest when some express support for terrorism, none object when students express hate of Jews" and that it says in "the Quran that you shall kill Jews, all true Muslims hate Jews". Most of these students were said to be born and raised in Norway. One Jewish father also told that his child after school had been taken by a Muslim mob (though managed to escape), reportedly "to be taken out to the forest and hung because he was a Jew".

It was revealed in April 2012 that Johan Galtung, a Norwegian sociologist who pioneered the discipline of peace studies and conflict resolution, made antisemitic comments during public speeches and lectures. Galtung claimed that there was a possible link between the Mossad and Anders Behring Breivik. He also claimed that six Jewish companies control 96% of the media in the United States, a frequent statement made by antisemites. Galtung also claimed that 70% of the professors at the 20 most important American universities are Jewish, and recommended that people read the fraudulent antisemitic manuscript The Protocols of the Elders of Zion.

Poland

At the onset of the 17th century, tolerance began to give way to increased antisemitism. Elected to the Polish throne King Sigismund III of the Swedish House of Vasa, a strong supporter of the counter-reformation, began to undermine the principles of the Warsaw Confederation and the religious tolerance in the Polish–Lithuanian Commonwealth, revoking and limiting privileges of all non-Catholic faiths. In 1628 he banned publication of Hebrew books, including the Talmud. Acclaimed 20th-century historian Simon Dubnow, in his magnum opus History of the Jews in Poland and Russia, detailed:
"At the end of the 16th century and thereafter, not one year passed without a blood libel trial against Jews in Poland, trials which always ended with the execution of Jewish victims in a heinous manner...." (ibid., volume 6, chapter 4).

In the 1650s, the Swedish invasion of the Commonwealth (The Deluge) and the Khmelnytsky Uprising of the Cossacks resulted in vast depopulation of the Commonwealth, as over 30% of the about 10 million population has perished or emigrated. In the related 1648–1655 pogroms led by the Ukrainian uprising against Polish nobility (szlachta), during which approximately 100,000 Jews were slaughtered, Polish and Ruthenian peasants often participated in killing Jews (The Jews in Poland, Ken Spiro, 2001). The besieged , who were also decimated in the territories where the uprising happened, typically abandoned the loyal peasantry, townsfolk, and the Jews renting their land, in violation of "rental" contracts.

In the aftermath of the Deluge and Chmielnicki Uprising, many Jews fled to the less turbulent Netherlands, which had granted the Jews a protective charter in 1619. From then until the Nazi deportations in 1942, the Netherlands remained a remarkably tolerant haven for Jews in Europe, exceeding the tolerance extant in all other European countries at the time, and becoming one of the few Jewish havens until 19th-century social and political reforms throughout much of Europe. Many Jews also fled to England, open to Jews since the mid-17th century, in which Jews were fundamentally ignored and not typically persecuted.
Historian Berel Wein notes:
"In a reversal of roles that is common in Jewish history, the victorious Poles now vented their wrath upon the hapless Jews of the area, accusing them of collaborating with the Cossack invader!... The Jews, reeling from almost five years of constant hell, abandoned their Polish communities and institutions...." (Triumph of Survival, 1990).

Throughout the 16th to 18th centuries, many of the  mistreated peasantry, townsfolk, and Jews. The threat of mob violence was a specter over the Jewish communities in Polish–Lithuanian Commonwealth at the time. On one occasion in 1696, a mob threatened to massacre the Jewish community of Posin, Vitebsk. The mob accused the Jews of murdering a Pole. At the last moment, a peasant woman emerged with the victim's clothes and confessed to the murder. One notable example of actual riots against Polish Jews is the rioting of 1716, during which many Jews lost their lives. Later, in 1723, the Roman Catholic Bishop of Gdańsk instigated the massacre of hundreds of Jews.

On the other hand, despite the mentioned incidents, the Polish–Lithuanian Commonwealth was a relative haven for Jews when compared to the period of the partitions of Poland and the PLC's destruction in 1795 (see Imperial Russia and the Soviet Union, below).

After an assassination attempt on the life of Alexander III of Russia, in the 1880s Russian Imperial forces began to settle Russian-speaking Lithuanian Jews in Polish-speaking areas. Cultural conflict emerged between the Russian-speaking Jews supported by the Russian Empire, financially and politically, and the Poles.

Leon Khazanovich, a leader of Poalei Zion, documented the pogroms and persecution of the Jews in 105 towns and villages in Poland in November–December 1918.

Anti-Jewish sentiments continued to be present in Poland, even after the country regained its independence. One notable manifestation of these attitudes includes numerus clausus rules imposed by almost all Polish universities in 1937. William W. Hagen, in his Before the "Final Solution": Toward a Comparative Analysis of Political Anti-Semitism in Interwar Germany and Poland article in Journal of Modern History (July 1996): 1-31, details:
"In Poland, the semidictatorial government of Piłsudski and his successors, pressured by an increasingly vocal opposition on the radical and fascist right, implemented many anti-Semitic policies tending in a similar direction, while still others were on the official and semiofficial agenda when war descended in 1939... In the 1930s the realm of official and semiofficial discrimination expanded to encompass limits on Jewish export firms... and, increasingly, on university admission itself. In 1921-22 some 25 percent of Polish university students were Jewish, but in 1938-39 their proportion had fallen to 8 percent."

While there are many examples of Polish support and help for the Jews during World War II and the Holocaust, there are also numerous examples of antisemitic incidents, and the Jewish population was certain of the indifference towards their fate from the Christian Poles. The Polish Institute of National Remembrance identified twenty-four pogroms against Jews during World War II, the most notable occurring at the village of Jedwabne in 1941 (see massacre in Jedwabne).

After the end of World War II, the remaining anti-Jewish sentiments were skillfully used at certain moments by the Communist party or individual politicians in order to achieve their assumed political goals, which pinnacled in the March 1968 events.
"Between 1968 and 1971, 12,927 stateless Poles of Jewish nationality (the emigration had automatically deprived them of their Polish citizenship) left the country. Their official destination was Israel. The state had allowed them to go only if they would choose Israel as their destination. Yet in fact, only 28% went there. Larger groups were also taken by Sweden, Denmark, and the US, and smaller numbers of people went to Italy, France, Germany, and Great Britain."

These sentiments started to diminish only with the collapse of the communist rule in Poland in 1989, which resulted in a re-examination of events between Jews and indigenous Christian Poles, with a number of incidents, like the massacre at Jedwabne, being discussed openly for the first time. Violent antisemitism in Poland in the 21st century is marginal compared to elsewhere, but there are very few Jews remaining in Poland. Still, according to the 7 June 2005 results of research by B'nai Brith's Anti-Defamation League, Poland remained among the European countries (with others being Italy, Spain, and Germany) with the largest percentages of people holding antisemitic views.

Antisemites in Poland have been appointed to crucial government and media positions. The former deputy chairman of Poland's state-owned TV Network, Piotr Farfal, is a Polish fascist, "far-right political activist and a former editor-in-chief of the Polish skinhead magazine Front, which openly supports anti-Semitism". Poland's former deputy prime minister and education minister Roman Giertych, who supported Farfal's appointment, is also a leader of the far-right and antisemitic League of Polish Families.

On 27 May 2006, Michael Schudrich, the chief rabbi of Poland, became the victim of an antisemitic attack when he was assaulted in central Warsaw by a 33-year-old Polish fascist, who confessed to assaulting the Jewish leader with what appeared to be pepper spray. According to the police, the perpetrator had ties to Nazi organizations and a history of soccer-related hooliganism.

Russia and the Soviet Union

The Pale of Settlement was the Western region of Imperial Russia to which Jews were restricted by the Tsarist Ukase of 1792. It consisted of the territories of former Polish–Lithuanian Commonwealth, annexed with the existing numerous Jewish population, and the Crimea (which was later cut out from the Pale). During 1881–1884, 1903–1906, and 1914–1921, waves of antisemitic pogroms swept Russian Jewish communities. At least some pogroms are believed to have been organized or supported by the Russian Okhrana. Although there is no hard evidence for this, the Russian police and army generally displayed indifference to the pogroms, for instance during the three-day First Kishinev pogrom of 1903.

During this period the May Laws policy was also put into effect, banning Jews from rural areas and towns, and placing strict quotas on the number of Jews allowed into higher education and many professions. The combination of the repressive legislation and pogroms propelled mass Jewish emigration, and by 1920 more than two million Russian Jews had emigrated, most to the United States while some made aliya to the Land of Israel.

One of the most infamous antisemitic tractates was the Russian Okhrana literary hoax, The Protocols of the Elders of Zion, created in order to blame the Jews for Russia's problems during the period of revolutionary activity.

Even though many Old Bolsheviks were ethnically Jewish, they sought to uproot Judaism and Zionism and established the Yevsektsiya to achieve this goal. By the end of the 1940s, the Communist leadership of the former USSR had liquidated almost all Jewish organizations, including Yevsektsiya.

Joseph Stalin's antisemitic campaign of 1948–1953 against so-called "rootless cosmopolitans", destruction of the Jewish Anti-Fascist Committee, the fabrication of the "Doctors' plot", the rise of "Zionology" and subsequent activities of official organizations such as the Anti-Zionist committee of the Soviet public were officially carried out under the banner of "anti-Zionism," but the use of this term could not obscure the antisemitic content of these campaigns, and by the mid-1950s the state persecution of Soviet Jews emerged as a major human rights issue in the West and domestically. See also: Jackson–Vanik amendment, Refusenik, Pamyat.

Stalin sought to segregate Russian Jews into "Soviet Zion", with the help of Komzet and OZET in 1928. The Jewish Autonomous Oblast with the center in Birobidzhan in the Russian Far East attracted only limited settlement, and never achieved Stalin's goal of an internal exile for the Jewish people.

Today, antisemitic pronouncements, speeches, and articles are common in Russia, and there are a number of antisemitic neo-Nazi groups in the republics of the former Soviet Union, leading Pravda to declare in 2002 that "Anti-semitism is booming in Russia." Over the past few years there have also been bombs attached to antisemitic signs, apparently aimed at Jews, and other violent incidents, including stabbings, have been recorded.  Anti-Semitic conspiracy theories were still widespread in Russian media by 2019 as well.

Slovakia

Following Jewish emancipation in 1896, many Jews in Slovakia (then Upper Hungary, part of the Kingdom of Hungary) had adopted Hungarian language and customs in order to advance. Many Jews moved to cities and joined the professions; others remained in the countryside, mostly working as artisans, merchants, and shopkeepers. Their multilingualism helped them advance in business, but put many Jews in conflict with the Slovak national revival. The leader of the Slovak national revival, Ľudovít Štúr, believed that Slovak Jews lacked a common history, culture, and society with Slovaks. Traditional religious antisemitism was joined by the stereotypical view of Jews as exploiters of poor Slovaks (economic antisemitism), and a form of "national anti-Semitism" accusing Jews of Hungarian irredentism, and later Czechoslovakism as Jews came to be associated with the Czechoslovak state. By the mid-1930s, a broad consensus of antisemitism had emerged across Slovak society.

Antisemitism in Slovakia has declined from the mid-20th century, which saw the deportation and murder of most of the Slovak Jews by the Slovak People's Party government led by Jozef Tiso. Antisemitism after the war manifested itself in events such as the Topoľčany pogrom in September 1945. More recently, politician Marian Kotleba has promoted the Zionist Occupation Government conspiracy theory and described Jews as "devils in human skin".

Slovenia

The first noticeable antisemitic movement dates back to 1496 when the entire Jewish community in the territory of Carinthia and Styria was expelled due to the decree issued by Emperor Maximilian I. He was under strong pressure from the local nobility. The last of these evictions was issued in 1828 but restrictions on settlement and business remained until 1861.

Modern antisemitism emerged in Slovenia in the late 19th century, first among ultra-traditionalist Catholics, such as the Bishop Anton Mahnič. However, this was still a cultural and religious antisemitism, and not a racist one. Racial antisemitism was first advanced in Slovenia by some liberal nationalists, like Josip Vošnjak. At the turn of the 20th century, antisemitism spread widely due to the influence of Austrian Christian Social Movement. The founder of Slovene Christian Socialism, Janez Evangelist Krek, was fiercely antisemitic, although many of his followers were not. However, antisemitism remained a recognizable feature of conservative, ultra-Catholic, and far-right groups in Slovenia until 1945.

About 4,500 Jews lived in Slovene areas before the mass transportation to the concentration camps in 1941. Many of them were refugees from neighboring Austria, while the number of Slovenian Jews with Yugoslav citizenship was much lower. According to the 1931 census, the Jewish community in the Drava Banovina (the administrative unit corresponding to the Yugoslav part of Slovenia) had less than 1,000 members, mostly concentrated in the easternmost Slovenian region of Prekmurje. In the late 1930s, anti-Jewish legislation was adopted by the pro-German regime of the Yugoslav Prime Minister Milan Stojadinović, supported also by the largest political party in Slovenia, the conservative Slovene People's Party. The party's leader, Dr. Anton Korošec had a strong antisemitic discourse and was instrumental in the introduction of the numerus clausus in all Yugoslav universities in 1938.

The vast majority of Slovene Jewry was murdered in Auschwitz and other extermination camps. The Nazis continued deporting Slovene Jews until 1945. The once-noticeable Jewish community of Prekmurje disappeared. Only individuals have returned; many immigrated to Israel soon after 1945.

In 1954, the local Communist party destroyed the last standing synagogue in Slovenia – the synagogue of Murska Sobota, which had survived the two years of Nazi occupation between 1944 and 1945. Before the final destruction, the synagogue was robbed and burned by the members of the party.

After returning from the concentration camps, many Jews realized they had been dispossessed by the new Communist government. Jewish people were automatically marked as an upper class, although the Nazis took most of the property. Jews who still owned houses or larger apartments were allowed to live in one room; the rest of their properties were owned by the Communist party. Some of the Jews who opposed this policy were told they were "welcome to leave at any time". Jews were also told it was better for them to leave if they wanted peace from OZNA.

During the Yugoslav socialist period, Jews were allowed to leave to go to Israel. However, if they decided to go, all of their properties and any possessions were automatically taken by the Communist party with no possibility of return. After the dissolution of Yugoslavia, some properties were returned to them. Many Jews who had immigrated from Slovenia to Israel have said they are now too old and too tired to start the process of returning.

In the 1990s and 2000s, antisemitism made a resurgence in Slovenia, mostly linked to anti-globalization and far-left movements. Since 1990, antisemitic discourse in Slovenia has been predominantly linked to the left of the political spectrum, while it has been mostly absent from right-wing rhetoric. The Slovenian National Party, which has been described by many as chauvinistic, has not been antisemitic. On the other hand, antisemitic remarks have been frequent among left-wing activists and commentators, as well as among the extra-parliamentary far-right groups.

In January 2009, during the Gaza War, the exterior of the synagogue was defaced with antisemitic graffiti, including  and Gaza. Although the synagogue is protected by security cameras, the culprits were never found.

On 15 April 2009, the public broadcaster RTV Slovenija published an article about Adolf Hitler where they wrote: "... 17 million people were killed automatically, among them probably 6 million Jews...." After being criticized for denying the number of Jewish victims, they changed the article. No official statement or explanation was made by RTV.

On 31 January, RTV again made controversial statements about the Holocaust and Israel, during the news. After showing the video of the liberation of Auschwitz, a TV reporter called the surviving Jews "successor of the terror who abuses the innocent people in a ghetto called Gaza with excessive brutal force". They ended an article with a statement, "when victim becomes a criminal." They also stated that Jews are abusing the meaning of Holocaust for political reasons.

Spain

Jews in Islamic-occupied Spain, Al-Andalus, were second-class dhimmis who were targeted in pogroms such as the 1066 Granada massacre. In 1492, via the Alhambra Decree, King Ferdinand and Queen Isabella ordered the expulsion of an estimated 800,000 Jews from the country, and thus put an end to the largest and most distinguished Jewish community in Europe. The coercive baptisms eventually produced the phenomenon of the conversos (Marranos), the Inquisition, and statutes of "blood purity" five centuries before the race laws in Nazi Germany. From the end of the nineteenth century, Jews have been perceived as conspirators, alongside the notion of a universal Jewish conspiracy to control the world. Following the Soviet revolution and the founding of the Spanish Communist Party in 1920, such "anti-Spanish forces" were primarily identified with the "destructive communist virus," often considered to be guided by the Jews.

During the Spanish Civil War, the alliance between Franco's faction and Nazi Germany opened the way for the emergence of antisemitism in the Spanish Right. It was during the 1960s that the first Spanish neo-fascist and neo-Nazi groups appeared, such as CEDADE. Later on, the Spanish neo-Nazis attempted to use antisemitic discourse to explain the political transition to democracy (1976–1982) following the death of General Franco. It drew on the same ideas that had been expressed in 1931 when the Second Spanish Republic was proclaimed – that political turning points could be explained as the result of various "intrigues". From 1948 until 1986, Israel was not recognized by Spain, and Israel and Spain had no diplomatic ties. In 1978, Jews were recognized as full citizens in Spain, and today the Jewish population numbers about 40,000 – 1 percent of Spain's population, 20,000 of whom are registered in the Jewish communities. The majority live in the larger cities of Spain on the Iberian Peninsula, North Africa or the islands.

Many of the prejudices cultivated during the Franco years persist in the twenty-first century. According to some, derived from the fact that almost all Spaniards are Catholic, and Spain remains to this day one of the most homogeneous Western countries, Spanish Judeophobia reflects a national obsession with religious and ethnic unity which is based on the conception of an imaginary "internal enemy" plotting the downfall of the Catholic religion and the traditional social order. However, this assumption clashes with the fact that 21st-century Spain is one of the most secularized countries in Europe, with only 3% of Spaniards considering religion as one of their three most important values and thus not linking it to their national or personal identity. Furthermore, in modern Spain there is not an "internal enemy" scare but in far-right circles, which are more often focused against Muslim immigration as well as Catalan and Basque separatism, way more visible phenomena. Modern antisemitic-like attitudes in Spain are actually related to the perceived abusive policies of the State of Israel against Palestinians and in the international scene rather than to any kind of religious or identity obsession, and it has been defined by Jewish authors as an "antisemitism without antisemites."

Pablo Iglesias, the founder of the Spanish political party Unidas Podemos, has a history of antisemitic remarks including: "the Holocaust was a mere bureaucratic problem," "the great Wall Street companies are practically all in the hands of Jews," and "the Jewish lobby supports initiatives against the peoples of the world," among others.

Sweden

After Germany and Austria, Sweden has the highest rate of antisemitic incidents in Europe, though the Netherlands reports a higher rate of antisemitism in some years. A government study in 2006 estimated that 15% of Swedes agree with the statement: "The Jews have too much influence in the world today". 5% of the total adult population and 39% of adult Muslims "harbour systematic antisemitic views". The former prime minister Göran Persson described these results as "surprising and terrifying". However, the rabbi of Stockholm's Orthodox Jewish community, Meir Horden, said that "It's not true to say that the Swedes are anti-Semitic. Some of them are hostile to Israel because they support the weak side, which they perceive the Palestinians to be."

In October 2010, The Forward reported on the current state of Jews and the level of antisemitism in Sweden. Henrik Bachner, a writer, and professor of history at the University of Lund, claimed that members of the Swedish Parliament have attended anti-Israel rallies where the Israeli flag was burned while the flags of Hamas and Hezbollah were waved, and the rhetoric was often antisemitic—not just anti-Israel. But such public rhetoric is not branded hateful and denounced.

Charles Small, director of the Yale University Initiative for the Study of antisemitism, stated that "Sweden is a microcosm of contemporary antisemitism. It's a form of acquiescence to radical Islam, which is diametrically opposed to everything Sweden stands for." Per Gudmundson, the chief editorial writer for Svenska Dagbladet, has sharply criticized politicians whom he claims offer "weak excuses" for Muslims accused of antisemitic crimes. "Politicians say these kids are poor and oppressed, and we have made them hate. They are, in effect, saying the behavior of these kids is in some way our fault."

Two documentaries, one produced in 2013 and another in 2015, secretly filmed reporters walking around Malmö wearing a kippah. In the 2013 documentary, the reporter only received strange looks and giggles, but in the 2015 documentary, in the mainly Muslim Rosengård neighborhood, the reporter was physically and verbally assaulted and had to flee. Fred Kahn, a leader of the local Jewish community, claimed that most incidents are committed by Muslims or Arabs.

Switzerland
 History of the Jews in Switzerland#Antisemitism in Switzerland

Turkey

Ukraine

There have been Jews in Ukraine since the Greek colonies of the Black Sea coast had their Jewish traders. Antisemitism has existed since at least the time of the Rus Primary Chronicle. Leaders of the Ukrainian nationalists of OUN (b) participated in the Holocaust during World War II. In Ukraine violence against Jews and antisemitic graffiti remains. Antisemitism has declined since Ukrainian independence in 1991.

United Kingdom

In 2004, members of the UK Parliament set up an inquiry into antisemitism, which published its findings in 2006. The inquiry stated that "until recently, the prevailing opinion both within the Jewish community and beyond [had been] that antisemitism had receded to the point that it existed only on the margins of society." It found a reversal of this progress since 2000. It aimed to investigate the problem, identify the sources of contemporary antisemitism and make recommendations to improve the situation. As of 2014, 9 percent of the British population held negative attitudes towards Jews.

See also

 Geography of antisemitism
 Hilsner Affair
 History of the Jews in Europe
 Human rights in Belarus
 Neo-Nazism in Europe
 Orientalism
 Xenophobia

References

Further reading

External links

 
The European Forum on Antisemitism

 
Articles containing video clips
Orientalism
Racism in Europe
Xenophobia